The Grand Cinema, also known as the Grand Cinema Gallery and Grand Theatre, is an historic theatre located at 216 West Nanjing Road in Shanghai's Huangpu District, in China.

Description and history
The theatre was designed by Ladislav Hudec and completed in 1933.

In 2013, Time Out Shanghai said of the venue: "Known to foreigners as 'the best cinema of the Far East', the Grand Cinema was frequented by Shanghai's glitterati in its 1930s heyday ... [It] was completed in 1933 and was the height of technological innovation – each seat had a translation system installed so that the Chinese audience could enjoy the foreign-language films through individual earpieces ... Now it's still great for getting a '20s and '30s Art Deco fix, from wrought iron railings to the up-lit stuccos, lashings of Italian marble and the signature font on the public signs. Though there are six screens, the biggest is Screen One (which you can enter through either 'odd' or 'even' entrances), split into two tiers of 1,554 seats."

References

External links

 

1933 establishments in China
Art Deco architecture in Shanghai
Buildings and structures in Shanghai
Cinemas and movie theaters in China
Huangpu District, Shanghai
László Hudec buildings
Theatres completed in 1933